Cheetah was an American rock music magazine launched in 1967. It was created by Ellen Willis, who later wrote for Rolling Stone, Village Voice, and other papers. Cheetah was influential but short-lived, closing in 1968.

See also
 "Goodbye Surfing, Hello God!"

References

Music magazines published in the United States
Magazines established in 1967
Magazines published in New York City